Norshida binti Ibrahim is a Malaysian politician and currently as Information UMNO Women chief since 2018 and former the Johor State Legislative Assemblywoman representing Buloh Kasap from 2013 to 2018.

Political career 
Norshida Ibrahim is currently the Segamat Division UMNO Wanita Chief and was appointed as the Wanita UMNO Malaysia Information Chief by Noraini Ahmad, the Wanita UMNO Malaysia Chief in November 2019.

She was also appointed as the Special Duty Officer to Dr Adham Baba, Minister of Health Malaysia in March 2020.

She also held the position of Head of the Johor State Puteri UMNO Movement in 2010-2013 and Norshida Ibrahim was the Head of the Segamat Division Puteri UMNO Movement from 2004-2013.

Election Results

Honours 
  :
  Companion Class II of the Exalted Order of Malacca (DPSM) - Datuk (2020)

References 

Living people
Year of birth missing (living people)
Malaysian people of Malay descent
Malaysian Muslims
United Malays National Organisation politicians
21st-century Malaysian politicians
Women MLAs in Johor
21st-century Malaysian women politicians